Lidiya Vladimirovna Alekseyeva (4 July 1924 – 26 June 2014) was a Russian basketball player and coach. Alekseyeva was born in Moscow. Alekseyeva was inducted into the inaugural class of the Women's Basketball Hall of Fame in 1999.
She was inducted into the FIBA Hall of Fame in 2007. On 24 February 2012, Alekseyeva was announced as a member of the Naismith Memorial Basketball Hall of Fame Class of 2012; she was formally inducted on 7 September.

Basketball playing career
As a player, Alekseyeva won the USSR Women's League with the MAI Moscow team in 1947, 1951, 1954, 1955, and 1956, and the USSR Cup in 1952. While playing with the senior USSR National Team, she won the gold medal at the EuroBasket Women, in 1950, 1952, 1954, and 1956.

Basketball coaching career
Alekseyeva was the head coach of the senior USSR Women's National Team for 22 years (1962–1984), and during that time the team won every competition they participated in. Specifically, they won the Summer Olympic Games gold in 1976 and 1980, the FIBA World Championship for Women in 1964, 1967, 1971, 1975, and 1983 (the USSR boycotted the 1979 tournament), and the EuroBasket Women in 1962, 1964, 1966, 1968, 1970, 1972, 1974, 1976, 1978, 1980, 1981, and 1983.

Awards and honors
Honored Master of Sports of the USSR (1950)
Order of Lenin (1957)
Honored coach of the USSR (1964)
Order of the Badge of Honor (1985)
Women's Basketball Hall of Fame Inductee (1999)
FIBA Hall of Fame (2007)

Personal life
Alekseyeva's husband, Evgeny Alekseev, was also a well-known basketball player and coach.

See also 
 List of EuroBasket Women winning head coaches

References

External links
 Naismith Hall of Fame page on Alekseyeva
 FIBA Hall of Fame page on Alekseyeva

1924 births
2014 deaths
Communist Party of the Soviet Union members
FIBA Hall of Fame inductees
Honoured Masters of Sport of the USSR
Merited Coaches of the Soviet Union
Naismith Memorial Basketball Hall of Fame inductees
Recipients of the Order of Lenin
Russian women's basketball coaches
Russian women's basketball players
Soviet women's basketball coaches
Soviet women's basketball players
Basketball players from Moscow